Darj-e Sofla (also Romanized as Dārj-e Soflá and Dāraj-e Soflá; also known as Dārīj-e Pā’īn, Dāraj-e Pā’īn, Dārj Pā’īn, and Qal‘eh Dārīj Pāīn) is a village in Zirkuh Rural District, Central District, Zirkuh County, South Khorasan Province, Iran. At the 2006 census, its population was 105, in 25 families.

References 

Populated places in Zirkuh County